The 1995 Ballon d'Or, given to the best football player in Europe as judged by a panel of sports journalists from UEFA member countries, was awarded to George Weah on 24 December 1995. It was the first edition of this award where players born outside Europe were allowed to receive votes.

Rankings

Additionally, 16 players were nominated but received no votes: Daniel Amokachi, Dino Baggio, Abel Balbo, Mario Basler, Júlio César, Didier Deschamps, Donato Gama, Stefan Effenberg, Vincent Guérin, Christian Karembeu, Bernard Lama, Japhet N'Doram, Jay-Jay Okocha, Fernando Redondo, Peter Schmeichel and Clarence Seedorf.

References

External links
 France Football Official Ballon d'Or page

1995
1995–96 in European football